The potato paradox is a mathematical calculation that has a counter-intuitive result. The Universal Book of Mathematics states the problem as such:

 

Then reveals the answer:

In Quine's classification of paradoxes, the potato paradox is a veridical paradox, meaning the result is true but appears absurd.

If the potatoes are 99% water, the dry mass is 1%. This means that the 100 kg of potatoes contains 1 kg of dry mass, which does not change, as only the water evaporates.

In order to make the potatoes be 98% water, the dry mass must become 2% of the total weight—double what it was before. The amount of dry mass, 1 kg, remains unchanged, so this can only be achieved by reducing the total mass of the potatoes. Since the proportion that is dry mass must be doubled, the total mass of the potatoes must be halved, giving the answer 50 kg.

Mathematical proofs 

Let x be the new total mass of the potatoes (dry + water).

Let d be the dry mass of the potatoes and w, the mass of water within the potatoes.

Recall w is 98% of the total mass, that is, w = 0.98x.

Therefore, x = d + w = d + 0.98x, i.e., x = d / 0.02 = 50 kg.

In our case, d = 1 kg so the new mass of the potatoes will indeed be 50 kg.

Let X be the mass lost. Since the solid (non-water) mass remains constant, then

X = initial water content – final water content

X = 99% 100 kg – 98% (100 kg – X)

X = 99 kg – 98 kg + 0.98X

1 kg = 0.02X

X = (1 kg)/0.02 = 50 kg

References

External links 
 

Mathematical paradoxes
Potatoes